WhiteTie is a concierge services, private membership club, online marketing company and travel agency based in Los Angeles, CA, USA and Hong Kong, China that provides extremely high end concierge services for customers worldwide.  The company provides premiere access to accommodations, shows, restaurants, entertainment and attractions throughout the world.

The company officially began selling services in August 2004 in Los Angeles. In January 2007 WhiteTie launched as the official concierge provider of Northwest Airlines.

References 

Hospitality companies of Hong Kong
Travel agencies
Hospitality companies of the United States